Furnishinidae is an extinct family of conodonts in the order Paraconodontida.

Genera
Genera are:
 †Furnishina
 †Muellerodus
 †Proacodus
 †Problematoconites
 †Prooneotodus
 †Prosagittodontus
 †Serratocambria
 †Trolmenia
 †Wangcunognathus
 †Yongshunella

References 

Upper cambrian conodonts from Sweden, KJ Muller and I Hinz, February 1991, Fossils and Strata, Oslo, Number 28
Middle Cambrian through lowermost Ordovician conodonts from Hunan, South China, Xi-ping Dong and Huaqiao Zhang, 2017, Journal of Palaeontology, Volume 91, pages 1-89,

External links 

 
 Furnishinidae at fossilworks.org (retrieved 8 May 2016)

Paraconodontida
Conodont families